The 1973 Bristol City Council election took place on 7 June 1973 to elect members of Bristol City Council in England. This was on the same day as other local elections. Voting took place across 28 wards, each electing 3 Councillors. Following the Local Government Act 1972, this was the first election to the new non-metropolitan district council for Bristol, which came into being on 1 April the following year. Labour took control of the Council after winning a comfortable majority of seats.

The National Front stood in four wards in this election

Ward results

Avon

Bedminster

Bishopston

Bishopsworth

Brislington

Cabot

Clifton

District

Durdham

Easton

Eastville

Henbury

Hengrove

Hillfields

Horfield

Knowle

Redland

Somerset

Southmead

Southville

St George East

St George West

St Paul

St Philip & Jacob

Stapleton

Stockwood

Westbury-on-Trym

Windmill Hill

References

1973 English local elections
1973
1970s in Bristol